Conus praelatus, common name the prelate cone, is a species of sea snail, a marine gastropod mollusk, in the family Conidae, the cone snails and their allies.

Distribution
This species occurs in the following locations:
 Madagascar
 Tanzania

References

 * Bozzetti L. (2015). Darioconus fortdauphinensis (Gastropoda: Prosobranchia: Conidae) new species from south-eastern Madagascar. Malacologia Mostra Mondiale. 88: 14-15

praelatus